Route 320 is a state highway in northeastern Connecticut, running from Mansfield to Willington and primarily serving as a northern link to the University of Connecticut.

Route description
Route 320 begins as Willington Hill Road at an intersection with Route 195 at the Mansfield Four Corners intersection and heads north into the town of Willington.  In Willington center, it continues north, briefly overlapping Route 74 (Tolland Turnpike), then continues north as Ruby Road to exit 71 of I-84. Past the I-84 overpass, Route 320 turns onto Lohse Road for another  and officially ends at the westbound I-84 off-ramp.

History
Route 320 was commissioned in 1963 from former SR 520 and has had no significant changes since. SR 520 itself was assigned to former town roads in Willington and Mansfield only the year before as part of the 1962 Route Reclassification Act.

Junction list

References

External links

320
Transportation in Tolland County, Connecticut